Palandöken Mountain is a mountain in Erzurum Province, Turkey.

Palandöken may also refer to:
Palandöken Dam, a dam in Erzurum Province, Turkey
Palandöken, Erzurum, a  district of Erzurum province, Turkey
Palandöken Ice Skating Hall, an ice hockey venue in Erzurum, Turkey
Palandöken Ski Center, a ski center in Palandöken Mountain, Turkey